Sue Worthington Bradley (born Sue Worthington Cox; December 25, 1883 – August 30, 1970) was the American First Lady of Guam from 1929 to 1931. She was the wife of naval Governor of Guam Willis W. Bradley.

Early life 
On December 25, 1883, Bradley was born as Sue Worthington Cox in Baltimore, Maryland. Bradley's father was Henry Cox (1847-1915). Bradley's mother was Elizabeth Janney (nee Merrefield) Cox (1850-1926). Bradley's siblings include Rebecca, Lillian, Josephine and Douglas.

Bradley attended Edgeworth School, a day and boarding school in Baltimore, Maryland.

Career 
In 1929, when Willis W. Bradley was appointed the military Governor of Guam, Bradley became the First Lady of Guam on June 11, 1929, until March 15, 1931.

Bradley became the President of Officers' Wives Club.

On March 26, 1964, Bradley sponsored the launching of USS Bradley at Bethlehem Steel Co in San Francisco, California. The USS Bradley was named for Bradley's husband, Captain Willis Winter Bradley, Jr.

Personal life 
On October 16, 1907, in Baltimore, Maryland, Bradley married Willis W. Bradley, Jr., who later became a US Navy officer and Military Governor of Guam. They had four daughters, Elizabeth, Sue, Anne, and Josephine. Bradley and her family lived in places including Long Beach, California and Guam.

In Guam, Bradley and her family lived in the ancient Spanish Governor's Palace.

On August 30, 1970, Bradley died in El Paso, Texas. Bradley is interred at Fort Rosecrans National Cemetery in San Diego, California.

References

External links 
 The Role of a Sponsor at societyofsponsorsofusn.org
 Sue Worthington Cox Bradley at findagrave.com
 Sue Worthington Cox at ancestry.com

1883 births
1970 deaths
Burials at Fort Rosecrans National Cemetery
First Ladies and Gentlemen of Guam
People from Maryland
People from El Paso, Texas